
Wynnefield is a diverse middle-class
neighborhood in West Philadelphia. Its borders are 53rd Street at Jefferson to the south, Philadelphia's Fairmount Park to the east, City Avenue (commonly referred to as "City Line") to the north and the Amtrak Philadelphia Main Line tracks to the west.

Surrounding neighborhoods include Bala Cynwyd to the north, Wynnefield Heights and Belmont Village to the east, Parkside to the south, and Overbrook to the west. Its main commercial arteries are North 54th Street, Bryn Mawr Avenue (2200 block), and City Avenue. It is the home of the television station WPHL-TV (MY PHL 17).

History
Like the nearby suburban community of Wynnewood, Wynnefield takes its name from William Penn's physician, Thomas Wynne, who built his home Wynnestay at 52nd Street and Woodbine Avenue in 1690. The former Woodside Amusement Park was located in nearby Fairmount Park and is now the separate community of Wynnefield Heights. 

Before Wynnefield's expansion in the early twentieth century, it was largely a rural and undeveloped area of farms dating back to the late 1600s. However, this changed with the construction of the Market-Frankford Elevated Train and the various trolley lines. With the creation of the lines it suddenly became easier for people to live farther from their jobs, and into the undeveloped areas of the city. Today, all but one of Philadelphia's trolley lines are exclusively operational in West Philadelphia.

In Philadelphia, the Jewish-American community were discriminated in certain neighborhoods in Philadelphia, prompting them to create their own community in Wynnefield. From about 1900, Wynnefield was considered an upscale community with predominantly Jewish-American residents. However, there were large groups of non-Jewish immigrants from Russia, Germany, and other Eastern European countries that formed the Wynnefield community.

In the 1920s Wynnefield expanded again, through the purchasing of rural lots, and their conversion into smaller plotted neighborhoods of row houses. Additional streets, such as Diamond Street were put in 1923 and additional row housing increasing the population of the neighborhood. German-Catholics moved into the neighborhood, prompting the founding of Saint Barbara's Roman Catholic Church in January 1921 on Georges Lane and Lebanon Ave near 54th Street.

Until the 1960s, an area near Wynnefield, Bala Cynwyd, across City Avenue in Lower Merion Township, was known as an upscale shopping district. Small, local boutiques thrived alongside of The Blum Store, Bonwit Teller, and Lord & Taylor. Betty's hat shop was a popular destination for the Main Line elite and Jackie Kennedy fans. Suburbanites would bring their families to spend the day shopping and to enjoy a meal at local haunts such as Pub Tiki and Williamson's Restaurant. Women from areas such as nearby Bucks County would ride into Bala Cynwyd on SEPTA buses, donning their best garb and wearing their white gloves.

In the mid-1960s, the neighborhood began the transition into being largely African American. As of 2006, changes to the neighborhood include the expansion of St. Joseph's University, and an influx of students and new residents of non-African descent moving into the area. Today Wynnefield closely parallels highly regarded Mt. Airy as being one of the most racially diverse neighborhoods in Philadelphia. 

Much of the development of Wynnefield after the 1960s is due to the influence of the late Katie B. Jackson (1929–1993). Known by the African-American community as "Queen of Wynnefield," Jackson founded the Wynnefield Academy, a private, co-educational PK-4 elementary school in 1975. The Katie B. Jackson Development Corporation and Katie B. Jackson Senior Citizens Complex bear her name.

Har Zion Synagogue, built at 54th & Wynnefield Ave in 1924, was a longtime resident of the area before moving to larger facilities in Penn Valley, PA in 1976.

The William Mann School and Wynnestay are listed on the National Register of Historic Places.

Demographic
According the U.S. Census from the 2019 American Community Survey 5-Year Estimates, the total population of 19131, which include Overbrook, Wynnfield, Belmont Village, and Wynnefield Heights, was 44,723 where 44.5% is male and 55.5% is female. Per the 2019 U.S. Census data, the community is 82.2% African-American, 13.4% Caucasian, 4.1% Asian/Pacific Islander and 3.6% Hispanic/Latino.

The mean household income in the past 12 months (in 2019 inflation-adjusted dollars) was $49,724.

Of the 21,361 total housing units located in the 19131 zip code per 2019 Census data, 8,544 or 48.8% are owner-occupied units. The neighborhood offers a variety of housing types: two-story brick town homes and row duplexes, garden apartments, and mid-rise and high-rise apartment homes. Apartment complexes include The Metropolitan - Wynnefield, The Dane, and The Premier at City Line among others.

Education

Colleges and universities
Saint Joseph's University is just outside the neighborhood. The boundary of Wynnefield is N. 54th Street.
The athletic fields, however, are in Wynnefield at North 54th St. and Overbrook to City Line Avenue

Primary and secondary schools

Public schools
Wynnefield is served by the School District of Philadelphia.

Elementary schools:
 Samuel Gompers Elementary School (K-8)
 William B. Mann Elementary School. However, this school is now a Mastery Charter School.
 
High schools:
 The neighborhood feeder school for Wynnefield is Overbrook High School.
 Science Leadership Academy at Beeber (The former Beeber Middle School)

Charter schools:

 The Laboratory Charter School of Communication and Languages

Private schools
 Woodbine Academy
 St. Rose of Lima Catholic School
 Settlement Music School, Wynnefield Branch

Public libraries
Free Library of Philadelphia operates the Wynnefield Branch .

Notable people
Wynnefield also has connections to the motion picture and music industries. Wynnefield is the childhood home of actor and rapper Will Smith, film producer Lee Daniels (Monster's Ball and The Woodsman), film director Charles Stone III, politico and former Big Brother reality-TV contestant Will Mega and documentary filmmaker Tigre Hill. Also, former basketball player Julius Erving once resided there as well as boxer Michael Spinks.

Local politicians with Wynnefield ties include Philadelphia mayor Michael Nutter, former mayor Wilson Goode, city councilman Curtis Jones, Jr, and councilwoman Blondell Reynolds Brown.

Places of worship
 Wynnefield Presbyterian Church
 Pinn Memorial Baptist Church
 West Side Baptist Church
 Wynnefield Baptist Church
 St. Barbara Catholic Church
 Bethel Holiness Pentecostel Church
 Overbrook Avenue Gospel Hall
 New Testament Church of God
 Endtime Zion Church of Jesus
 Community Bible Tabernacle Church
 International Church of God
 Church of the Advocate
 Evelyn Graves Ministries Church
 Baha'i Community of Phila
 Bawa Muhaiyaddeen Fellowship Mosque
 Kol Tzedek Synagogue

References

External links
 InfoResources West Philadelphia Neighborhood - Wynnefield
 West Philly On-line Wynnefield history
 William B. Mann Elementary School
 Beeber Middle School
 Settlement Music School - Wynnefield Branch
 History of Har Zion
 Mosque of Shaikh M. R. Bawa Muhaiyaddeen

Neighborhoods in Philadelphia
West Philadelphia